Kyle Mark Takai (July 1, 1967 – July 20, 2016) was an American politician from the state of Hawaii who served in the United States House of Representatives, representing , from 2015 to 2016. He served in the Hawaii House of Representatives from 1994 to 2014.

A native of Honolulu, Hawaii, Takai last served in the Hawaii Army National Guard as a lieutenant colonel and took part in Operation Iraqi Freedom in 2009, concurrent with his political career. He became the Democratic Party nominee for the U.S. House in the 2014 elections, defeating former Congressman Charles Djou to win the seat.

Takai announced in May 2016 that he would not seek reelection due to ill health; he died from cancer two months later.

Early life and education
Takai was born in Honolulu, Hawaii. He received his diploma from Pearl City High School in 1985, where he was a four-time high school swimming champion and a high school All-American swimmer. Takai received a Bachelor of Arts degree in political science and a Master of Public Health degree from the University of Hawaii at Manoa. At the university, Takai was a Western Athletic Conference champion swimmer, president of the Associated Students of the University of Hawaii, and editor-in-chief of the campus newspaper. He was a member of the 1998 class of the Pacific Century Fellows.

Political career
Takai was first elected to the Hawaii House of Representatives in 1994, representing the 34th house district of Pearl City, near Pearl Harbor. He was reelected eight times before shifting to represent the 33rd house district of Aiea in 2012. Takai chaired the House Committee on Culture and the Arts from 1997 to 2000. He also served as vice chair of the House Committee on Higher Education (1995–2002) and as chair in 2003–2004. Additionally, he chaired the House Committee on Veterans, Military, & International Affairs, & Culture and the Arts. During the 2005 and 2006 sessions, Takai served as Vice Speaker of the House.

He won the election with 51.2% of the vote, defeating Republican nominee Charles Djou. In November 2015, he introduced the Atomic Veterans Healthcare Parity Act, extending federal compensation to those made sick by involvement in cleanup operations after bomb tests on Pacific islands.

Committee assignments
Committee on Armed Services
Subcommittee on Tactical Air and Land Forces
Subcommittee on Strategic Forces
Committee on Small Business
Subcommittee on Agriculture, Energy and Trade
Subcommittee on Contracting and Workforce (Ranking Member)

Military service
Takai was commissioned as first lieutenant in the Hawaii Army National Guard (HIARNG) on July 19, 1999, and worked as the Preventive Medical Officer. He was the Division Chief for Soldiers Services and a School Liaison for the HIARNG. He later became a lieutenant colonel on May 14, 2013. Takai also served as the President of the Hawaii National Guard Association and the President of the National Guard Association-Hawaii Insurance, Inc.

Takai was called to active duty for six months (May to November 2005) and served as the Hawaii Army National Guard Deputy State Surgeon. He later served as the Company Commander of Charlie Company (Medical), 29th Brigade Support Battalion from November 2006 to May 2008. Takai was posted abroad during Operation Iraqi Freedom as the Base Operations Officer (Camp Mayor) at Camp Patriot, Kuwait, from February 2009 to September 2009.

Among his numerous awards and decorations, Takai received the Meritorious Service Medal from the United States Army in 2009, the Distinguished Service Medal from the National Guard Association of the United States in 2011, and the Hawaii Distinguished Service Order in 2012.

Illness and death
Takai was diagnosed with a small tumor on his pancreas in late October 2015. On May 19, 2016, he announced that he would not seek reelection because his cancer had spread, but vowed to serve the remaining eight months of his term. He died two months later at his home in Aiea. He was 49. He was survived by his wife, Sami, and their two children.

In 2018, Takai was posthumously inducted into the Hawaii Swimming Hall of Fame.

See also
List of Asian Americans and Pacific Islands Americans in the United States Congress
List of United States Congress members who died in office

References

External links

Campaign site

1967 births
2016 deaths
20th-century American politicians
21st-century American politicians
United States Army personnel of the Iraq War
American Episcopalians
American military personnel of Japanese descent
Deaths from cancer in Hawaii
Deaths from pancreatic cancer
Democratic Party members of the United States House of Representatives from Hawaii
Hawaii National Guard personnel
Hawaii politicians of Japanese descent
Hawaii Rainbow Warriors swimmers
Democratic Party members of the Hawaii House of Representatives
Members of the United States Congress of Japanese descent
Asian-American members of the United States House of Representatives
Military personnel from Hawaii
National Guard (United States) officers
Politicians from Honolulu
Swimmers from Hawaii
University of Hawaiʻi at Mānoa alumni
United States Army colonels